Nellie Taptaqut Kusugak  (born 1955) is a Canadian educator who served as the fifth commissioner of Nunavut from June 2015 to June 2020.

Early life 
Kusugak is from Rankin Inlet. Kusugak received a BEd in 1996 through the Nunavut Teachers Education Program provided by Nunavut Arctic College (NAC) and McGill University, where she is listed as an adjunct professor. She has been a teacher for about 20 years in both Inuktitut and English. Prior to her appointment as deputy commissioner, she was an adult educator at NAC in Rankin Inlet.

Political career 
Kusugak served as Deputy Commissioner of Nunavut from 2010 to 2015. She was appointed by Minister of Indian Affairs and Northern Development, Chuck Strahl, on 15 February 2010 and was sworn in on 25 February. On 11 April 2010, Kusugak became the acting Commissioner of Nunavut with the expiry of Ann Meekitjuk Hanson's term and served until the appointment of Edna Elias a month later. As the territorial head of state, Kusugak represented all Nunavut citizens. While in office, she gave Assent to bills passed by the legislative assembly, swore in cabinet ministers, and signed off on documents, among other official duties.

Personal life 
Kusugak was married to former Nunavut Tunngavik Incorporated president, Jose Kusugak.

Honours and Arms 

  Member of the Order of Nunavut
 Louie Kamookak Medal, Royal Canadian Geographical Society

References

1955 births
Living people
Commissioners of Nunavut
Inuit politicians
Women in Nunavut politics
People from Rankin Inlet
Canadian Inuit women
Inuit from the Northwest Territories
Inuit from Nunavut
Canadian indigenous women academics